This is a list of navigable canals that are at least partially located in Germany.  The canals are listed here in alphabetic order of the name (without generic).

Currently navigable canals

Formerly navigable canals

Incomplete navigable canal projects

See also
Transport in Germany
List of rivers of Germany

 
Germany
Canals
Canals
Germany geography-related lists

de:Liste der Kanäle